William Henry Roberts (born 1880 in Bromley, deceased) was an English professional footballer who made two appearances in the Football League for Preston North End. He also played for Southern League clubs Tottenham Hotspur, Grays United, Brighton & Hove Albion, where he was top scorer in the 1903–04 season with nine goals in all competitions, and Queens Park Rangers. He played as an inside left.

References

1880 births
Date of birth missing
Year of death missing
Place of death missing
Footballers from Liverpool
English footballers
Association football forwards
Tottenham Hotspur F.C. players
Stockport County F.C. players
Brighton & Hove Albion F.C. players
Queens Park Rangers F.C. players
Preston North End F.C. players
Southern Football League players
English Football League players
FA Cup Final players